Bettange-sur-Mess Castle is located in the village of Bettange-sur-Mess near Dippach in the southwest of Luxembourg. Built in 1753 by René Louis de Geisen, the castle has changed ownership several times. Since 1996, it has been a retraining centre for mentally handicapped persons run by the Association des Parents d’Enfants Mentalement Handicapés.

See also
List of castles in Luxembourg

References

External links
A.P.E.M.H.: Le Domaine du Château à Bettange-sur-Mess  

Castles in Luxembourg
Dippach